David+Martin is a German creative and advertising agency. The headquarters are located in Munich.

Company history 
The agency was founded in 2015 by Martin Eggert and David Stephan. Their first client was the cheese manufacturer Leerdammer. 2016 the company moved into an office close to the Viktualienmarkt in Munich.

In 2018 David+Martin worked on the regional election campaign for the German Green Party Alliance 90/The Greens. In response to the campaign, the agency first received propaganda flyers from a German right wing party; later a pigs head was placed outside the agency's office, which led to a police investigation.

In May 2021 Mark Hassan joined the agency's management. Later that year, Katrin Strathus became head of Human Resources.

Martin Eggert is a board member of Gesamtverband Kommunikationsagenturen GWA (Association of communication agencies) and was co-founder of their U30 advisory board in 2021.

Company structure 
In 2021 the company had more than 40 employees and a revenue of €4 million. The management of the company consists of David Stephan and Martin Eggert.

Social engagement 
In 2015 David+Martin created the gin brand "Refugin", with profits from the beverage going to the Munich Schlau-Schule ("smart-school") which offers classes for refugees to help them graduate school. They also created a sustainability report for the nonprofit organisation Social Bee, which illustrates the refugee route from Lesbos to Germany. In 2020, they worked on an awareness campaign for the German non-governmental organisation Sea-Watch.

References

External links 
 

Advertising agencies of Germany
Marketing companies established in 2015
German companies established in 2015
Companies based in Munich